Ante Puljić (born 5 November 1987) is a Croatian footballer who plays as defender for Israeli side Bnei Sakhnin.

Career
Born in Mostar in Bosnia and Herzegovina, Puljić spent most of his career in Croatia, first passing through the ranks of Hajduk Split's academy, and them joining second-level side Zadar on a free transfer in the summer of 2006. After establishing himself as a first team regular and helping the club win promotion to top level at the end of the 2006–07 season, Puljić went on to spend the following five seasons at the club making 106 first league appearances for Zadar.

In July 2011 his contract at Zadar ended and he signed for Dinamo Zagreb's farm team NK Lokomotiva and after only one appearance for Lokomotiva in the 2010–11 Prva HNL season, he was transferred on a year-long loan to Dinamo in August, but was returned to Lokomotiva in January 2012. On 23 December he signed a contract binding him to KAA Gent till 2017, starting 3 January 2014.

In September 2019, he signed a contract with Dinamo București.

Statistics

Honours
KAA Gent
Belgian First Division: 2014–15

References

External links

1987 births
Living people
People from Ljubuški
Croats of Bosnia and Herzegovina
Association football central defenders
Croatian footballers
NK Zadar players
NK Lokomotiva Zagreb players
GNK Dinamo Zagreb players
K.A.A. Gent players
FC Dinamo București players
FC Tom Tomsk players
Al-Faisaly FC players
Bnei Sakhnin F.C. players
Croatian Football League players
Belgian Pro League players
Liga I players
Russian Premier League players
Russian First League players
Saudi Professional League players
Israeli Premier League players
Croatian expatriate footballers
Expatriate footballers in Belgium
Expatriate footballers in Romania
Expatriate footballers in Russia
Expatriate footballers in Saudi Arabia
Expatriate footballers in Israel
Croatian expatriate sportspeople in Belgium
Croatian expatriate sportspeople in Romania
Croatian expatriate sportspeople in Russia
Croatian expatriate sportspeople in Saudi Arabia
Croatian expatriate sportspeople in Israel